The eGolf Professional Tour, formerly the Tarheel Tour, was a third-level men's professional golf tour based in Charlotte, North Carolina with about twenty tournaments conducted annually in the states of North Carolina, South Carolina, Virginia and Georgia.

The Tarheel Tour was founded in 2002 by Paul Wortham and David Siegel. It was purchased by Five Oaks Capital in August 2008 and renamed the eGolf Professional Tour the following year. In August 2015, the eGolf Tour was bought by Golf Interact and was integrated into the Swing Thought Tour.

As a development tour, the eGolf Professional Tour was designed to be a stepping stone for players trying to ascend to higher level tours. Many players on the tour have gone on to play on the second tier Web.com Tour, and a few have reached the top level on the PGA Tour: Jason Kokrak, Peter Malnati, Will MacKenzie, Steve Marino, Jason Bohn, Tommy Gainey, Matt Bettencourt, David Mathis, Seamus Power William McGirt, and Roberto Castro.

Money leaders

References

External links 
eGolf Professional Tour – official site

Professional golf tours
Golf in North Carolina
Recurring sporting events established in 2002
2002 establishments in North Carolina
Recurring sporting events disestablished in 2015
2015 disestablishments in North Carolina